Joshua Schachter (born January 1, 1974) is an American entrepreneur and the creator of Delicious, creator of GeoURL, and co-creator of Memepool. He holds a B.S. in electrical and computer engineering at Carnegie Mellon University in Pittsburgh.

Schachter released his first version of Delicious (then called del.icio.us) in September 2003. The service coined the term social bookmarking and featured tagging, a system he developed for organizing links suggested to Memepool and publishing some of them on his personal linkblog, Muxway. On March 29, 2005, Schachter announced he would work full-time on Delicious. On December 9, 2005, Yahoo! acquired Delicious for an undisclosed sum. According to Business 2.0, the acquisition was close to $30 million, with Schachter's share being worth approximately $15 million.

Prior to working full-time on Delicious, Schachter was an analyst in Morgan Stanley's Equity Trading Lab. He created GeoURL in 2002 and ran it until 2004. In 2006, he was named to the MIT Technology Review TR35 as one of the top 35 innovators in the world under the age of 35. In June 2008 Schachter announced his decision to leave Yahoo!. TechCrunch reported that the recent news coming out of Yahoo! about mass resignations of senior staff pressed his decision to leave. He worked for Google from January 2009 to June 2010.

References

External links

 
 Interview with Joshua about del.icio.us
 Businessweek article on tagging

1974 births
Living people
People from Long Island
Carnegie Mellon University College of Engineering alumni
20th-century American Jews
People in information technology
21st-century American Jews